"Billericay Dickie" is a song by Ian Dury, from his debut album New Boots and Panties!!. It is narrated by a bragging bricklayer from Billericay, and is filled with name-checks for places in Essex. The song is based around naughty rhymes such as:

I had a love affair with Nina
  in the back of my Cortina
A seasoned up hyena
  could not have been more obscener
She took me to the cleaners
  and other misdemeanours;
 but I got right up between her
  rum and her ribena.

Each verse tells a different short story, relating one of Dickie's sexual conquests around south-eastern England, while in the choruses the character insists he is a caring, conscientious lover and 'not a thickie', even giving the names of two girls ("a pair of squeaky chickies") as references to attest this. Dickie is a character most commonly referred to in the media as an 'Essex lad'. The song, perhaps the best example of Dury's 'Englishness' and 'Essexness', was given its oompah, fairground like arrangement by an American, Steve Nugent.

Ian Dury stated on numerous occasions (as mentioned in both his biographies, Sex and Drugs and Rock and Roll: The Life of Ian Dury and Ian Dury & The Blockheads: Song By Song) that he saw Dickie as a pathetic figure. He would reflect this on-stage by breaking down, as if he were about to cry during the final part of the song, before returning to normal, to shout the final lines of the final verse. The song was rarely used as an opening track for live sets (another song from New Boots and Panties!!, "Wake Up and Make Love with Me", was used instead), but it does open the set recorded live at the Hammersmith Odeon, in 1985, that was released as the Hold Onto Your Structure VHS/DVD. Live versions can be found on both of Dury's live albums Warts 'n' Audience and Straight from the Desk.

In Australia, the song formed the basis of the jingle in ads for cleaning product Ajax Spray n' Wipe. The ad campaign ran from 1988 to 2010.

References

Sources

Reasons To Be Cheerful 2-Disc Compilation first released 1996, Repertoire Records 
New Boots And Panties!! — label credit on Stiff Records SEEZ 4, released 1977 

1977 songs
Songs written by Ian Dury
Billericay